The NS 8800 was a series of tank engines of the Dutch railway NS for the shunting service. Of the approximately 324 British-built Hunslet Austerity C (0-6-0ST) saddle tank locomotives, many were used by the British War Department during their fight against the German army in mainland Western Europe. The NS bought 27 of them just after World War II. They had been built by the Hunslet Engine Company (12), WG Bagnall (3), Robert Stephenson & Hawthorns (RSH) (6) and Hudswell Clarke (6).

In NS service 
After the departure of the British army in 1945, the Dutch Railways bought 31 copies. Four engines were sold to the Staatsmijnen in Limburg after a short time. The other 27 were assigned the NS numbers 8801-8827 and were used for shunting until 1957. They were liked by crews and had the name not to "leave" any train standing. Shunting a heavy coal train was not difficult for these locomotives and they were loved by drivers and firemen alike. With their water tanks built around the boiler like a saddle (hence the name saddle tank locomotive) and their two internal cylinders, they looked very different from the traditional Dutch shunting locomotives of the NS 8700 and NS 9500 series. In the years between 1953 and 1957 six engines were sold, five to the Laura and Julia coal mine (8811 and 8826 in 1953, 8812 in 1954, 8807 and 8815 in 1957) and one to the United Cooperative Sugar Factories in Roosendaal (8817 in 1955). The remaining engines were scrapped during that time.

Period after service with the NS
After the NS withdrew the engines in 1957, a large number were sold to the Laura and Julia Mine and the Oranje Nassau Mine, where they remained in use until the mines were closed in 1974. The locomotives that were sold to the Staatsmijnen were scrapped in the period 1960-1961. Three engines have been preserved. In 1981 the Stoom Stichting Nederland bought the former NS 8811, built by Hudswell Clarke in 1943. In 2010 this locomotive was partially made roadworthy. On April 13, 2012, the now completely restored locomotive was presented to invited guests at the SSN depot. The former NS 8826, built by Hunslet in 1944, was bought in 1975 by the Metaalhandel Gebr. van Raak in Tilburg, who loaned the locomotive to the Stichting Stoomtrein Tilburg-Turnhout between 1976 and 1981 for a heritage steam service on the Tilburg - Turnhout railway line. After the line closed the locomotive returned to Tilburg. In 1998 the locomotive was purchased by the Zuid Limburgse Stoomtrein Maatschappij with the intention of making it roadworthy again. The boiler of the former NS 8812 on the frame of the former NS 8815 has returned to England, where the locomotive bears the name 'Walkden' and is used on the Ribble Steam Railway.

References

External links
ZLSM | De mijloenenlijn

8800
0-6-0ST locomotives
Steam locomotives of the Netherlands
Hunslet locomotives
Bagnall locomotives
Robert Stephenson and Hawthorns locomotives
Hudswell Clarke locomotives
Standard gauge locomotives of the Netherlands